Adham Medhat (born May 30, 1975) is an Egyptian sport shooter. At age thirty-three, Medhat made his official debut for the 2008 Summer Olympics in Beijing, where he competed in the men's trap shooting. He finished only in thirty-second place by one point behind Australia's Craig Henwood, for a total score of 108 targets.

References

External links
NBC Olympics Profile

Egyptian male sport shooters
Trap and double trap shooters
Living people
Olympic shooters of Egypt
Shooters at the 2008 Summer Olympics
Sportspeople from Cairo
1975 births